| colspan=7 |* Labor also retained four of the five Labor seats which were made notionally Liberal by the 2013 redistribution.

This is a list of electoral district results for the Victorian 2014 election for the Legislative Assembly.

Results by electoral district

Albert Park

Altona

Bass

Bayswater

Bellarine

Benambra

Bendigo East

Bendigo West

Bentleigh

Box Hill

Brighton

Broadmeadows

Brunswick

Bulleen

Bundoora

Buninyong

Burwood

Carrum

Caulfield

Clarinda

Cranbourne

Croydon

Dandenong

Eildon

Eltham

Essendon

Euroa

Evelyn

Ferntree Gully

Footscray

Forest Hill

Frankston

Geelong

Gembrook

Gippsland East

Gippsland South

Hastings

Hawthorn

Ivanhoe

Kew

Keysborough

Kororoit

Lara

Lowan

Macedon

Malvern

Melbourne

Melton

Mildura

Mill Park

Monbulk

Mordialloc

Mornington

Morwell

Mount Waverley

Mulgrave

Murray Plains

Narracan

Narre Warren North

Narre Warren South

Nepean

Niddrie

Northcote

Oakleigh

Ovens Valley

Pascoe Vale

Polwarth

Prahran

Preston

Richmond

Ringwood

Ripon

Rowville

Sandringham

Shepparton

South Barwon

South-West Coast

St Albans

Sunbury

Sydenham

Tarneit

Thomastown

Warrandyte

Wendouree

Werribee

Williamstown

Yan Yean

Yuroke

See also 
 Results of the Victorian state election, 2014 (Legislative Council)
 2014 Victorian state election
 Candidates of the Victorian state election, 2014
 Members of the Victorian Legislative Assembly, 2014–2018

References 

Results of Victorian state elections
Victorian Legislative Assembly
2010s in Victoria (Australia)